Cholewa is a Polish surname. It can refer to:
Anita F. Cholewa (born 1953), American botanist
Marek Cholewa (born 1963) Polish ice hockey player
Laurie Cholewa (born 1980), French television presenter
Cholewa coat of arms, used by many Polish szlachta

See also
 

Polish-language surnames